Jim Fitzgerald (14 December 1924 – 6 June 2003) was an Australian rules footballer who played with Geelong and St Kilda in the VFL.

A backman, Fitzgerald was a best and fairest winner for Geelong in 1945 and briefly captained them during the 1949 season. He finished his career at St Kilda before retiring in 1952.

References

External links

1924 births
Australian rules footballers from Victoria (Australia)
St Kilda Football Club players
Geelong Football Club players
Geelong Football Club captains
St Joseph's Football Club players
Carji Greeves Medal winners
2003 deaths